Zaïtuni Abdallah is a Burundian politician. She served in the Senate of Burundi representing Karusi and in the Pan-African Parliament representing Burundi.

References

Burundian women in politics
Living people
Year of birth missing (living people)
Members of the Pan-African Parliament from Burundi